The Immediate Geographic Region of Itajubá is one of the 10 immediate geographic regions in the Intermediate Geographic Region of Pouso Alegre, one of the 70 immediate geographic regions in the Brazilian state of Minas Gerais and one of the 509 of Brazil, created by the National Institute of Geography and Statistics (IBGE) in 2017.

Municipalities 
It comprises 14 municipalities.

 Brazópolis   
 Conceição das Pedras   
 Delfim Moreira     
 Gonçalves    
 Itajubá   
 Maria da Fé    
 Marmelópolis     
 Paraisópolis   
 Pedralva     
 Piranguçu      
 Piranguinho     
 São José do Alegre     
 Sapucaí-Mirim     
 Wenceslau Braz

See also 

 List of Intermediate and Immediate Geographic Regions of Minas Gerais

References 

Geography of Minas Gerais